Brachiolia egenella is a species of moth of the family Tortricidae first described by Francis Walker in 1864. It is found in Sri Lanka, India, South Africa and on the Comoros and Mauritius.

The larvae feed on Cardiospermum species, feeding from within the rolled leaves of their host plant. Full-grown larvae reach a length of about 11 mm. They have a light green body and a shining light-yellow head. Pupation takes place in a white elongate-oval cocoon formed inside a rolled leaf.

References

Moths described in 1864
Tortricini